Luca Salvetti (born 9 September 1966 in Livorno) is an Italian politician and journalist.

He ran for Mayor of Livorno at the 2019 local elections, supported by the Democratic Party in a centre-left coalition. He was elected on 9 June and took office on 11 June 2019.

See also
2019 Italian local elections
List of mayors of Livorno

References

External links
 

1966 births
Living people
Mayors of Livorno